Cass Daley (born Catherine Dailey; July 17, 1915 – March 22, 1975) was an American actress, comedian and singer. The daughter of an Irish streetcar conductor, Daley started to perform at night clubs and on the radio as a band vocalist in the 1940s.

Career
Daley began singing as a child in front of neighborhood storefronts. Noted for her buck teeth and comical singing style, she sang at clubs as a teen while working as a hat-check girl and electrician.

In the 1930s, she began a stage career, including a role in a production advertised as a "Great Vaudeville Show" in 1934. She appeared in the 1936-1937 Ziegfeld Follies featured as the "Cyclone of Syncopation."

In the 1940s, Daley embarked on a movie career, most notably in The Fleet's In (1942) with Dorothy Lamour and Betty Hutton and Crazy House (1943) with Ole Olsen and Chic Johnson. She also starred opposite Dick Powell and Dorothy Lamour in Riding High in 1943, and opposite Eddie Bracken and Diana Lynn in Out of This World in 1945. She had a part in Red Garters opposite Rosemary Clooney in 1954, and her last movie appearances were in The Spirit Is Willing in 1967 and in Norwood in 1970.

In 1944–1945, she was a regular on The Frank Morgan Show on NBC radio. As a frequent radio guest, she appeared semi-regularly in 1944 on The Bob Burns Show on NBC. She was also a very popular singer with the troops overseas during World War II, and appeared many times on Armed Forces Radio Service (AFRS) broadcasts such as Command Performance and Mail Call. In 1945, she joined the cast of The Fitch Bandwagon, another popular radio show. In 1950, she starred in her own radio show, The Cass Daley Show.

Daley recorded several singles with Hoagy Carmichael. "The Old Piano Roll Blues" peaked at #11 on the Billboard Hot 100 chart and stayed on the chart for ten weeks in 1950, and "Aba Daba Honeymoon" peaked at #23 in 1951, and charted for three weeks.

She recorded a version of "Put the Blame on Mame" in 1946, and it sold 150,000 copies in just two months.

With radio in decline, she retired to raise her son in Newport Beach. After her divorce from husband Frank Kinsella, she attempted a comeback in the 1970s appearing in small television, film and stage roles.  She was among the stars in the 1972 nostalgia revue Big Show of 1928, which toured the country and played New York's Madison Square Garden.

Death
On March 22, 1975, alone in her apartment, the 59-year-old comedian apparently fell and landed on her glass-top coffee table. A shard of glass jammed into her throat and she bled out before her husband came home and discovered her.

Legacy
For her contribution to the television and radio industry, Cass Daley has two stars on the Hollywood Walk of Fame at 6303 Hollywood Blvd. Cass Daley is buried next to a tree along the roadside in the north end of Section 8 (the new Garden of Legends), at Hollywood Forever Cemetery in Hollywood, California.

Filmography

Discography

References

External links

 
 
 
 

1915 births
1975 deaths
Accidental deaths in California
American film actresses
American musical theatre actresses
American radio actresses
American television actresses
Burials at Hollywood Forever Cemetery
Actresses from Philadelphia
American women comedians
Vaudeville performers
20th-century American actresses
Deaths from bleeding
20th-century American singers
20th-century American women singers
20th-century American comedians